The 2018 Web.com Tour was the 29th season of the top developmental tour for the PGA Tour in men's golf, and the seventh under the current sponsored name of Web.com Tour. It runs from January 13 to September 23. The season consists of 27 official money tournaments, five of them played outside of the United States.

Schedule
The following table lists official events during the 2018 season.

Location of tournaments

Money leaders
For full rankings, see 2018 Web.com Tour Finals graduates.

Regular season money leaders
The regular season money list was based on prize money won during the season, calculated in U.S. dollars. The top 25 players on the tour earned status to play on the 2018–19 PGA Tour.

Finals money leaders
A further 25 players earned status to play on the 2018–19 PGA Tour, via the Web.com Tour Finals.

Awards

Notes

References

External links
Official schedule

Korn Ferry Tour seasons
Web.com Tour